Ohio elected its members October 12, 1824.

See also 
 1824 and 1825 United States House of Representatives elections
 List of United States representatives from Ohio

1824
Ohio
United States House of Representatives